Lawrence Joseph Doyle (July 31, 1886 – March 1, 1974), nicknamed "Laughing Larry", was an American second baseman in Major League Baseball from 1907 to 1920 who played almost his entire career for the New York Giants. The National League's outstanding second baseman during the 1910s, he was awarded the  Chalmers Award as the league's best player, and won the  batting title with a .320 average. The team captain and top everyday star on three consecutive pennant winners (1911–1913), his .408 career slugging average was the top mark by an NL second baseman when he retired, as were his career totals in hits (1887), doubles (299), triples (123), total bases (2654) and extra base hits (496). He ended his career among the major league leaders in career games (5th, 1730), putouts (9th, 3635), assists (9th, 4654), total chances (9th, 8732) and double plays (5th, 694) at second base, and set Giants franchise records for career games, at bats and doubles, each of which was broken by Bill Terry.

Biography
Doyle was a third baseman in the minor leagues before his contract was purchased by the Giants for a then-record $4,500. He debuted with the Giants on July 22, arriving late after taking the wrong boat across the Hudson River; he cost his team the game with a ninth-inning error, though he also had a pair of hits.  He expected to be returned to the minor leagues; instead, he was retained by manager John McGraw, who named him the team's field captain in 1908 – a year in which he finished third in the batting race with a .308 average. Doyle, who also became the roommate of Christy Mathewson for several years, followed up with a  season in which he led the NL in hits (172) and was among the league's top four players in batting (.302), slugging (.419), home runs (6) and total bases (239). 1910 saw a slight dropoff, though he was still third in the NL in home runs (8) and fourth in runs scored (97). He then entered the strongest part of his career; in  he finished third in the voting for the initial Chalmers Award after hitting .310 and finishing second in the league with a .527 slugging average – the highest by an NL second baseman since Ross Barnes slugged .590 in the league's inaugural 1876 campaign. Doyle also led the league with 25 triples, the most by an NL player since 1899; it remains the highest total by a Giant since 1900. He stole 30 bases for the third consecutive year, and finished fourth in the league in home runs (13) and fifth in runs (102). In the 1911 World Series against the Philadelphia Athletics, he batted .304; with the Giants facing elimination in Game 5, he went 4 for 5, doubling and scoring an intensely disputed run in the 10th inning for a 4–3 victory. He again doubled and scored for a 1–0 lead in the first inning of Game 6, but the Giants lost the game 13–2, and with it the Series.

Doyle then had a 1912 season which was perhaps even better, winning the Chalmers Award after hitting a career-high .330 as the Giants repeated as NL champions. In the 1912 World Series against the Boston Red Sox he only hit .242, though he scored the first run in a Game 6 victory and was 3 for 4 with a home run in an 11–4 rout in Game 7. But he was 0 for 5 in Game 8 as the Red Sox won 3–2 in ten innings, after New York took a 2–1 lead in the top of the 10th, to capture the title. In 1913 the Giants won their third straight pennant; although he batted only .280, he stole 30 bases for the fifth year in a row and was eighth in the NL with 73 runs batted in. That year, he became the first player to hit a home run out of the Polo Grounds. He had an even more dismal 1913 World Series, hitting only .150 against the Athletics as the Giants lost in five games, though he did drive in the first run of the Series. In  he slipped to a .260 average, but was fourth in the league in runs. On July 17, he hit a home run in the top of the 21st inning to defeat the Pittsburgh Pirates 3–1.

He enjoyed renewed success in 1915, however, winning the batting crown with a .320 average; it was the first title won by an NL second baseman since Barnes in 1876. Doyle was also second in the NL in runs (86) and fifth in slugging (.442). He began 1916 with a .278 average before being traded to the Chicago Cubs in late August, a painful move for the fiercely loyal player who had famously said in 1911 that it was "great to be young and a Giant." After hitting .395 for the Cubs in nine games that year, he batted .254 for the team in 1917, finishing fourth in the league with 6 home runs, before a pair of January 1918 trades brought him back to New York. He hit .261 in his return to the Giants before having his last outstanding season in 1919; that year he again was league runnerup in slugging with a .433 average, and was fifth in home runs (7). At the time, he was within five games of Johnny Evers' league record for career games at second base.

Doyle ended his career with a .290 batting average, putting him behind only Nap Lajoie (.338), Eddie Collins (then at .329) and Cupid Childs (.306) among players with 1000 games at second base. His 74 home runs placed him third at his position behind Fred Pfeffer (94) and Lajoie (83). He also had 960 runs and 794 RBI in 1766 games, as well as 298 stolen bases including 17 steals of home plate; he held the Giants club record for career steals from 1918 to 1919, when teammate George Burns passed him. Baseball Magazine selected Doyle as the second baseman on their NL All-America Team in 1911 and 1915.

Doyle contracted tuberculosis in 1942, and entered the Trudeau Sanitorium in Saranac Lake, New York. When the institution closed in 1954 due to the development of an effective antibiotic treatment, he was the last resident to leave; Life Magazine photographers covered his last meal and his departure, on foot, from the grounds. He stayed on in Saranac Lake, and died there 20 years later, at age 87.

See also

 List of Major League Baseball career triples leaders
 List of Major League Baseball career stolen bases leaders
 List of Major League Baseball batting champions
 List of Major League Baseball annual doubles leaders
 List of Major League Baseball annual triples leaders

References

External links

Larry Doyle MLB Baseballbiography.com
Baseball Evolution Hall of Fame – Player Profile

Major League Baseball second basemen
New York Giants (NL) players
Chicago Cubs players
Baseball players from Illinois
National League batting champions
Toronto Maple Leafs (International League) managers
Mattoon Indians players
Mattoon-Charleston Canaries players
Springfield Senators players
Toronto Maple Leafs (International League) players
Nashville Vols players
1886 births
1974 deaths
People from St. Clair County, Illinois
Place of birth missing